Grant Prince Marsh (May 11, 1834 – January 1916) was a riverboat pilot and captain who was noted for his many piloting exploits on the upper Missouri River and the Yellowstone River in Montana from 1862 until 1882.  He started to work as a cabin boy in 1856, eventually becoming a captain, riverboat pilot and riverboat owner, in a career lasting over sixty years. During that time, he achieved an outstanding record and reputation as a river steamboat pilot and captain, serving on more than 22 vessels. His piloting exploits became legendary and modern historians refer to him as "Possibly the greatest steamboat man ever", "possibly the greatest [steamboat pilot] ever", "possibly the finest riverboat pilot who ever lived", "the greatest steamboat master and pilot on both the Missouri and Yellowstone Rivers"

After the discovery of gold in Montana Territory in the early 1860s, the Missouri River was the major artery for freight and passengers to go from "the states" to Fort Benton, the head of navigation in the territory.  The last 300 miles ran through the unsettled prairie and the remote Missouri breaks.  As a riverboat pilot on the upper Missouri River Marsh contended with migrating buffalo herds, hostile Indians, and violent windstorms, along with underwater hazards from rapids, snags and sandbars.

In the 1860s and 1870s the Yellowstone River, a tributary of the Missouri in the Montana Territory, penetrated deeply into an area dominated by the Sioux, Cheyenne and Crow tribes.  From 1873 to 1879 Marsh piloted shallow draft paddle wheel riverboats making pioneer voyages up the Yellowstone River in Montana, in support of several military expeditions into Indian country. In 1875, he made the highest upriver ascent of the Yellowstone River in the Josephine arriving at a point just above present day Billings Montana.

Grant Marsh is most often referenced by historians for his exploit in 1876 as the pilot of the Far West, a shallow draft steamboat operating on the Yellowstone River and its tributaries, which was accompanying a U.S. Army column that included Lt. Colonel George Armstrong Custer and the 7th Cavalry.  The army column was part of the Great Sioux War of 1876, and its most noted battle was the Battle of the Little Bighorn, often known as "Custer's Last Stand" on June 25–26, 1876.  After the battle, from June 30 to July 3, 1876, Marsh piloted the Far West down the Yellowstone and the Missouri Rivers to Bismarck, carrying fifty-one wounded cavalry troopers from the site of the defeat of Lt. Colonel George Armstrong Custer at the Battle of the Little Bighorn.   He brought the first news of the "Custer Massacre" which was disseminated to the nation via telegraph from Bismarck.  Most noteworthy in riverboat lore, Marsh set a downriver steamboat record, traversing some 710 river miles in 54 hours.

After railroads brought about the decline of riverboats on Montana rivers in the 1880s, Marsh continued to work as a steamboat pilot on the Mississippi and the lower Missouri working on ferries, snag boats, and hauling bulk loads. He remained a steamboatman until his death in 1916 at the age of 82.

Early years

Grant Marsh began work on the Allegheny River as a cabin boy at the age of 12. He became a first mate and student pilot under Samuel Clemens (Mark Twain) on the Mississippi in 1858. When the Civil War broke out in 1861, he worked on riverboats hauling troops and supplies for the Union during the Fort Donelson and Shiloh campaigns on the Tennessee River. In 1862, he worked on the Mississippi in the Vicksburg campaign. After Vicksburg, in 1862 he began to work on boats traveling up the Missouri River, hauling army supplies and troops in campaigns against hostile Indians in the Dakota Territory.

Upper Missouri and Yellowstone years

After the gold discoveries in western Montana in 1862, steamboats began to carry passengers and freight to the "upper Missouri" River terminus at Fort Benton, Montana. The trip from St. Louis to Fort Benton took 60 days or longer.  Freight and passenger rates were high, and steamboat traffic was very lucrative—a single successful trip could pay the entire cost of a shallow draft stern wheeler riverboat.

There were rapids located in the last 300 river miles which traversed the remote "Missouri breaks" area.  Steamboats would leave St. Louis early in the spring and try to get above the rapids on the spring rise in mid to late June.  They would then try to get back downstream over the rapids before failing water levels made them more dangerous.  A boat that stayed too late risked the rapids in low water, and also becoming ice bound.

Marsh was a major figure in upper Missouri River steamboat navigation from the days of the early Montana gold discoveries in 1862 until 1888.  He was so confident in his piloting skills that he would operate on the upper Missouri late in the season, running the rapids in low water.  In 1866 he became Captain of the Louella at the age of 34.  He brought the Louella to Fort Benton, but then stayed until September, embarking with a load of miners who were catching the last boat of the summer and who had $1,250,000 in gold, the most valuable shipment ever carried on the Missouri.

In 1868, Marsh took the Nile up river during the fall and wintered the boat and successfully returned downriver in the spring, undamaged.  In late 1869 he took the North Alabama upstream loaded with vegetables, despite the risk of being ice bound, going all the way to the mouth of the Yellowstone River to deliver the fresh provisions to Fort Buford.

Marsh met the special challenges that faced a pilot/captain of riverboat on the upper Missouri and Yellowstone Rivers. He encountered Indians who shot at his boat.  He was delayed by buffalo herds crossing the river ahead of him. He winched his way up rapids with a current so strong that he had to attach a rope to an upstream tree or a "deadman" planted in the bank.  He learned to "grasshopper" his way over sandbars in low water. In this process, the boat sank spars down to the river bottom from the prow of the boat.  A steam driven winch and a rope harness over the top of the spar was used  to hitch the front of the boat up on the spars and then to slide the boat forward for a few feet of progress.  The process was repeated until the sand bar was crossed.

Coulson Packet Company

In 1871, Captain Marsh went into business with Commodore Sanford B. Coulson, his two brothers, and other noteworthy businessmen, and formed the Coulson Packet Company, which soon became famous in the Missouri River's history. Their objective was to establish a company that would have complete domain over the steamboat business on the upper Missouri River. The boats originally owned by this powerful syndicate were the Far West, Nellie Peck,  Western, Key West, E. H. Durfee, Sioux City and Mary McDonald.

The upstarting company soon established a reputation for reliability, in moving freight and in commanding men. During the 1870s they did military contract work, hauling supplies to posts along the Missouri River and ferrying army explorers and survey parties up the Yellowstone River.  Assisting in military expeditions, Marsh made pioneer voyages on the Yellowstone such as the highest ascent of the Yellowstone (to just above present day Billings, Montana) in the shallow draft stern wheel boat Josephine in 1875.

Piloting the Far West

Grant Marsh is most commonly remembered in history as the steamboat pilot/captain of the Far West, who on July 3, 1876, brought the first news to Bismarck of the "Custer Massacre" that had occurred on the Little Bighorn in the Montana Territory on June 25, 1876. On the Far West were fifty wounded troopers from the battle. In an epic feat of riverboat piloting Marsh brought the Far West from the mouth of the Little Bighorn River down the Bighorn to the Yellowstone River, then to the Missouri, and then down to Bismarck. He made the run from the mouth of the Bighorn to Bismarck over a period of 4 days, from June 30 to July 3, 1876. Rarely leaving the wheel, he traversed some 710 river miles in 54 hours setting a record for steamboat travel that still stands.

Far West & Nellie Peck 2800 mile race

Similar in design to the steamboat Far West, the Nellie Peck was also a sternwheel packet, built in 1871 at Brownsville, Pennsylvania, and whose construction was supervised by Captain Marsh.  That year Nellie Peck made her first journey up the Missouri River to Fort Benton, Montana. She made 13 more trips there during her career.

Later career

After 1876, Marsh continued to work on the Missouri River.  Late in 1877, he left the Coulson Packet Co., and in the spring of 1878, signed on with Joseph Leighton and Walter B. Jordan, who were Indian traders at Fort Buford, North Dakota Territory.  The traders wanted to get into the transport business, and they had purchased a steamboat that was being constructed in the Pittsburgh boat yards, the F.Y. Batchelor.  Marsh traveled to Pittsburgh and brought the boat to the Dakota Territory.  In 1878, 1879, 1880 and 1881 he piloted the F.Y. Batchelor up the Missouri and then up the Yellowstone bringing supplies to Fort Keogh (near present-day Miles City, Montana) and Fort. Custer (near present-day Hardin, Montana).

In August 1878, Marsh set another steamboat speed record, when he piloted the Batchelor from Bismarck to Fort Buford, a distance of 307 miles in 55 hours and 25 minutes. This established a new speed record for upstream steamboat travel on the Missouri and Yellowstone Rivers.

In 1879, Marsh purchased a ferry boat, the Andrew S. Bennett, which was in service between Bismarck and Mandan on the Missouri River.  He hired a pilot to operate the ferry while he continued to pilot the F.Y. Batchelor on the Missouri and Yellowstone River.

In 1881 and 1882, the Northern Pacific Railroad built west from Bismarck, Dakota Territory, to the Yellowstone River valley, and then up the valley and over the continental divide.  This ended riverboat traffic on the Yellowstone River.

In 1882 Marsh purchased his own riverboat, the W.J. Behan and continued to haul freight and passengers on the Missouri River out of Bismarck.  In 1882 the Sioux Chief Sitting Bull returned from Canada where he had sought refuge in 1877 following the Battle of the Little Bighorn.  He surrendered to the Army at Fort Randal with his remaining followers.  In late April 1883, Marsh accepted an assignment to take the W.J. Behan up the Missouri to Fort Randal and transport Sitting Bull downstream to the Standing Rock Reservation.

In 1883 as Missouri steamboat traffic declined with the expansion of railroad lines through the Dakota Territory and  into the Montana Territory, Marsh sold the W.J. Behan and moved from Bismarck to Memphis, Tennessee and then to St. Louis. There were still opportunities for a steamboat pilot on the Mississippi River, and Marsh continued to work.  For the next dozen years, he operated ferry boats and tug boats on the Mississippi, and following this he did a variety of jobs.

In 1901, William D. Washburn, a business man had built a railroad to the Missouri River above Bismarck, and bought a large tract of land in the area, which was rapidly being settled.  Washburn also bought several small light-draft steamboats and barges to haul lumber and merchandise upriver from Bismarck to the settlers, and to bring down grain and other produce.  Washburn sought out Marsh in St. Louis and importuned him to return to Bismarck enter his employ as a riverboat captain, and  In 1902 Marsh returned to Bismarck and to his career on the upper Missouri River in command of the River snag-boat Choctaw.

In 1904 Washburn sold out his interests in Dakota to the Minneapolis and St. Paul Railroad, who immediately sold all the steamboats and barges to Isaac P. Baker who reorganized as the Benton Packet Company. The Missouri River valley was filling with Homesteaders who were taking up land on both the east and west banks of the river. These new communities were not served by any railroad and Baker saw an opportunity to provide passenger and freight transport to this growing population extending along both banks of the Missouri River.  Baker enlarged the company to include five steamboats, six barges and two ferryboats.

Marsh continued with the Benton Packet Company, serving at one time or another as captain/pilot of each of the five steamboats. He also operated a "snag" boat which traveled up and down the river, removing sunken "snag" trees and other underwater obstacles.

In 1907 Marsh resigned his position with Benton Co.  On August 23, he went aboard his former boat, the Expansion, and confronted the pilot, William R. Massie, who he felt was being abusive.  Massie subsequently charged Marsh with assault, and at a hearing before the Department of Commerce and Labor on December 6, 1907, Marsh's license was revoked.

Death and burial

On January 6, 1916, Grant Marsh died in Bismarck, North Dakota.  He was reported to have "died in near poverty", as Issac P. Baker, his manager at the Benton Packet Co. laid claim to much of his estate because of unpaid bills.  Marsh asked to be buried on Wagon Wheel Bluff overlooking the Missouri, but he was buried in a simple grave in Bismarck's St. Mary's Cemetery. It is one of the higher spots in Bismarck and its view of the Missouri is not bad at all. A large rock serves as his tombstone. The rock is engraved with an image of a riverboat.

Memorials

Grant Marsh is remembered by statues and place names.

 The I-94 Grant Marsh Bridge over the Missouri River at Bismarck, North Dakota, was constructed in 1965 as part of the I-94 highway project, and it was rebuilt in 2001.
 There is a life size statue of Capt. Grant Pierce Marsh, overlooking the Missouri River at Riverside Park in Yankton, South Dakota.  The inscription reads, "Captain Grant Prince Marsh, 1834-1916, Steamboat captain, Pilot and Riverman.  'He never flinched at the call of duty'. Sculpted by Frank Yaggie 1989."
 The Grant Marsh fishing access and wild life management area is on the Bighorn River, 7 miles north of Hardin, Montana.
 The (now abandoned) railroad station and (ghost) town of Marsh in Dawson County, Montana, was on the Northern Pacific Railroad, midway between Terry, Montana, and Glendive, Montana.
 A Liberty Ship, built in 1943 during World War II, was initially named for Grant P. Marsh at the start of ship construction, but the ship was completed as the Valery Chkalov and given as part of a loan to the USSR.

See also
Paddle steamer
Great Sioux War of 1876
Battle of the Little Bighorn
Joseph LaBarge — Famous riverboat captain on the Missouri River, whose brother, John, once partnered with Captain Marsh

References

Sources

External links
 Riverboat Dave's web site, listing all riverboat captains by alphabetical order, including Grant P. Marsh, listing each boat by year that each captain commanded, and adding comments on highlights of their various careers.
  Wyoming Trails and Tails, Little Big Horn Page, comment on Grant P. Marsh’s role, as captain/pilot of the Far West in supporting column of soldiers on the Yellowstone in 1876, during the Great Sioux War of 1876, and in bringing wounded from the Little Bighorn Battlefield downriver to Bismarck, North Dakota.
  Montana Fish Game and Wildlife Department page describing the Grant P. Marsh Fishing Access on the Bighorn River, and Montana Fish and Wildlife Department page describing the Grant P. Marsh Wildlife management site on the Bighorn River.
  A Mark Twain web site, this page contains quotes from Marsh and Twain about each other.
 Yellowstone Genealogy Forum, this site has a letter from Marsh dated 1907 to President Theodore Roosevelt, opposing the building of an irrigation diversion dam because it would prevent future steamboat traffic on the Yellowstone River.
  Missouri National Recreational River site, a division of the National Park Service, this page has a biography of Grant Marsh.
  Historical Fort Benton, this page has biographical facts about Grant Marsh, listing the riverboats he commanded, year by year, with a commentary.
 "Steamboat Story". Time. August 19, 1946. Report of the reissue of The Conquest of the Missouri by Joseph Mills Hanson with a story about Marsh.

Missouri River
Steamboats of the Missouri River
Paddle steamers of the United States
History of North Dakota
History of Montana